is a passenger railway station located in the city of  Matsudo, Chiba Prefecture, Japan operated by the private railway operator Ryūtetsu. It is numbered station RN2.

Lines
Kōya Station is served by the Nagareyama Line, and is located 1.7 km from the official starting point of the line at Mabashi Station.

Station layout
The station consists of one side platform serving  single bi-directional track.

History
Kōya Station was opened on February 3, 1961

Passenger statistics
In fiscal 2018, the station was used by an average of 4590 passengers daily.

Surrounding area
 Shin-Matsudo Station
 Matsudo City Hall Shinmatsudo Branch
 Shinmatsudo Central General Hospital

See also
 List of railway stations in Japan

References

External links

 official home page  

Railway stations in Japan opened in 1961
Railway stations in Chiba Prefecture
Matsudo